Hamad Al-Hosani (Arabic:حمد الحوسني) (born 15 January 1987) is an Emirati footballer who plays as a midfielder, most recently for Baniyas.

References

External links
 

Emirati footballers
1987 births
Living people
Al Wahda FC players
Al Dhafra FC players
Al-Ittihad Kalba SC players
Al Ahli Club (Dubai) players
Al-Wasl F.C. players
Ajman Club players
Dubai CSC players
Baniyas Club players
Association football midfielders
UAE First Division League players
UAE Pro League players